Happy Families is a British children's television series made in the late 1980s based on the Happy Families series of books by Janet and Allan Ahlberg. Happy Families ran for two series, 24 episodes in all (since each story was split over two episodes), and was shown on Children's BBC in 1989 and 1990.

Synopsis 
Each tale is about a family of characters – typically father, mother, son and daughter, but this varies.

The cast played several different characters throughout the series with many recurring roles for the main cast including Milton Johns, Annette Badland and Elizabeth Estensen.

Cast 
 Milton Johns – Mr Clarence Creep, Mr Ding, Mr Cross the Inspector, Mr Alphonso
 Annette Badland – Mrs Wobble the Waitress, Mrs Plug the Plumber, Mrs Lather
 Elizabeth Estensen – Mrs Clara Creep, Mrs Tick the Teacher, Miss Trump
 Richard Hope – Mr Tick, PC Arntby, Mr Bun, Mr Plug, Mr Harry Hay, Captain Salt, Mr. Cash, Mr. Jump
 Tamsin Heatley – Mrs Jump, Mrs Bop, Mrs Brick, Mrs Salt, Mrs Hay, Mrs Bun
Martyn Ellis-Mr Biff, Mr Money, Blackbeard, Teddy the Chef, Sailor. Martyn also wrote original songs for the show.
 London Kim – Master Money, Master Salt, Teddy Tick
 Ben Thomas – Mr Wobble, Mr Brick, Mr Bop, Mr Toad, Mr Wallis the Warder https://showreel.thetvroom.com/talent-profiles/3705/thomas-ben/

Episodes

Series One (1989)
 "Mrs Wobble the Waitress"
 "Mr Tick the Teacher"
 "Mr Creep the Crook"
 "Master Bun the Baker's Boy"
 "Mrs Plug the Plumber"
 "Mr and Mrs Hay the Horse"

Series Two (1990)
 "Mrs Lather's Laundry"
 "Master Salt the Sailors' Son"
 "Miss Brick the Builders' Baby"
 "Master Money the Millionaire"
 "Mr Biff the Boxer"
 "Miss Jump the Jockey"

External links

Happy Families page at classickidstv.co.uk

BBC children's television shows
British television shows based on children's books
1980s British children's television series
1990s British children's television series
1989 British television series debuts
1990 British television series endings